The singles discography of American country music singer George Strait comprises 126 charted singles. Starting with "Unwound" in 1981, Strait has reached the Top 10 of the Hot Country Songs charts with all but 14 of his single releases. He has 44 No. 1s on the Billboard country charts, the most of any artist.  Strait has also amassed 86 Top 10 hits on Billboards Hot Country Songs chart, second only to Eddy Arnold, who had 92.

Singles

1970s and 1980s

1990s

2000s

2010s

As a featured artist

Other charted songs

B-sides
The following songs are B-sides that charted separately.

Christmas songs
The following songs charted from Christmas airplay.

Other charted songs
The following songs charted from unsolicited airplay.

Notes

Music videos

Guest appearances

References

Country music discographies
 
Discographies of American artists